Erin Huck (born June 17, 1981) is an American cross-country mountain biker. She competed in the women's cross-country event at the 2020 Summer Olympics. Huck also competed in the 2015 Pan American Games, winning bronze.

References

1981 births
Living people
Cross-country mountain bikers
American female cyclists
Olympic cyclists of the United States
Cyclists at the 2020 Summer Olympics
Cyclists at the 2015 Pan American Games
Pan American Games bronze medalists for the United States
Pan American Games medalists in cycling
Medalists at the 2015 Pan American Games
People from Estes Park, Colorado
Sportspeople from Boulder, Colorado
21st-century American women
Cyclists from Colorado